Ieva Cederštrēma-Volfa (born 13 April 1969) is a Latvian biathlete. She competed at the 1994 Winter Olympics and the 1998 Winter Olympics.

References

1969 births
Living people
Biathletes at the 1994 Winter Olympics
Biathletes at the 1998 Winter Olympics
Latvian female biathletes
Olympic biathletes of Latvia
Place of birth missing (living people)